Nationality words link to articles with information on the nation's poetry or literature (for instance, Irish or France).

Events
August 27 – Spanish playwright and poet Lope de Vega dies aged 72 of scarlet fever in Madrid. This year also his illegitimate son Lope Félix, another poet, is drowned in a shipwreck off the coast of Venezuela and his youngest daughter Antonia Clara is abducted.
 Ottoman Turkish poet Nef'i is garroted in the grounds of the Topkapi Palace in Istanbul for his satirical verses.

Works published

Great Britain
 Thomas Heywood:
 The Hierarchie of the Blessed Angells, has the much-quoted passage "Mellifluous Shakes-peare, whose inchanting Quill/Commanded Mirth or Passion" ...
 Philocothonista; or, The Drunkard, Opened, Dissected, and Anatomized
 Francis Quarles, Emblemes
 Joseph Rutter, The Shepheard's Holy-Day: A pastorall tragi-comaedie
 George Wither, A Collection of Emblemes, Ancient and Moderne, with emblems printed from engravings originally produced by Crispijn van de Passe the Elder for Gabriel Rollenhagen's Nucleus Emblematorum 1611–1613

Other
 Gabriel Bocángel, Lira de las muses ("The Muses' Lyre"), containing both ballads and sonnets; Spain
 Jean Chapelain, De la poésie représentative, France
 Lope de Vega, Filis, eclogue, Spain
 Antoine Godeau, Discours sur la Poésie Chrétienne, France

Births
 February 21 – Thomas Flatman (died 1688), English poet and miniature painter
 June 3 – Philippe Quinault (died 1688), French dramatist, poet, and librettist
 September 20 (bapt.) – Thomas Sprat (died 1713), English bishop and poet

Deaths
Birth years link to the corresponding "[year] in poetry" article:
 March – Thomas Randolph (born 1605), English poet and dramatist
 April 7 – Leonard Digges (born 1588), English poet and translator
 April 25 – Alessandro Tassoni (born 1565), Italian
 July 28 – Richard Corbet (born 1582), English
 August 7 – Friedrich Spee (born 1591), German Jesuit and poet
 August 27 – Lope de Vega (born 1562), Spanish playwright and poet
 October 18 – Jean de Schelandre (born c. 1585), French
 Nef'i (born 1582?), Ottoman Turkish
 Shen Yixiu (born 1590), Chinese poet and mother of female poets Ye Xiaoluan, Ye Wanwan and Ye Xiaowan

See also

 Poetry
 17th century in poetry
 17th century in literature

Notes

17th-century poetry
Poetry